Myxine capensis, the Cape hagfish, is a species of jawless fish in the family Myxinidae.

It inhabits muddy bottoms on the continental shelf off the coast of southern Africa, from southern Namibia, along the coast of South Africa, east to southern Mozambique. Despite heavy fishing pressure in its range, no major population declines have been reported, so it is considered a species of Least Concern on the IUCN Red List. It is thought to be a frequent prey item of the southern giant octopus (Enteroctopus magnificus).

References 

Myxinidae
Fish described in 1913
Marine fauna of Southern Africa
Taxa named by Charles Tate Regan